Ghostbusters II is the soundtrack album for the film of the same name, released by MCA Records in 1989. The soundtrack includes the Billboard Hot 100 number two hit "On Our Own" performed by Bobby Brown, as well as Run-D.M.C.'s rendition of "Ghostbusters". The film score, Ghostbusters II: Original Motion Picture Score is composed by Randy Edelman. Since the release of the film in 1989, the complete film score was unreleased, until it was finally released on August 13, 2021.

Ghostbusters II

Development
Ray Parker Jr. helped develop an updated version of his hit song "Ghostbusters", performed by Run-D.M.C. Aiming to replicate the success of the original soundtrack, producer Peter Afterman wanted to hire Bobby Brown, who had a recent succession of hit songs. To secure Brown's involvement, Afterman offered Brown's music label, MCA Records, the rights to the soundtrack. Brown agreed in exchange for receiving a role in the film. Filming had nearly concluded at that time, but Reitman wrote Brown a cameo as the mayor's doorman.

Brown worked with Dennis Austin, Larry White and Kirk Crumpler to write and produce "We're Back". Other songs on the soundtrack include "Flip City" by Glenn Frey, "Spirit" by Doug E. Fresh & The Get Fresh Crew, and "Love is a Cannibal" by Elton John. The song "Flesh 'n Blood" by composer Danny Elfman and Oingo Boingo was written for the film but Elfman said he was disappointed that only four musical bars of it were used. He thought the small usage was an excuse to be able to release it on the soundtrack and said if he had known he would have pulled the song.

Singles 
Two singles were releases from the album, Bobby Brown's "On Our Own" and Run-D.M.C.'s "Ghostbusters". Brown's single performed better, reaching number two on the Billboard Hot 100, while Run-D.M.C.'s did not chart. Music videos were released for both.

Track listing

Weekly charts

Year-end charts

Certifications

Ghostbusters II: Original Motion Picture Score

Development
Randy Edelman composed the score for Ghostbusters II. It was one of Edelman's first experiences working with a large scale orchestra. Although familiar with Ghostbusters, he chose not to re-watch it for inspiration so the sequel would have its own unique sound. Edelman believed the distinct personalities of the existing characters meant they rarely needed a musical accompaniment, and instead focused his efforts on scoring the supernatural and action setpieces to represent the menace and "dark nature of the evil Carpathian".

Track listing

See also
Ghostbusters (1984 soundtrack)
Ghostbusters (2016 soundtrack)
Ghostbusters: Afterlife (soundtrack)

References

Ghostbusters music
1989 soundtrack albums
MCA Records soundtracks
Sony Classical Records soundtracks
Comedy film soundtracks